Sir Frederick Herbert Stanley Brown  (9 December 1910 – 1997) was an English mechanical and electrical engineer.
Born in Birmingham and educated at the King Edward's School, Birmingham he then went on to the University of Birmingham where he graduated with a first class honours degree in electrical engineering in 1932. In 1937 he was involved in the design and development of Hams Hall B power station. He joined the CEGB in 1958 upon its inception and in September 1959 he was appointed deputy chairman. On 1 January 1965, he succeeded Christopher Hinton as chairman of the CEGB and was followed by Sir Arthur Hawkins in 1972. In the 1967 Birthday Honours, he received his knighthood for services to the electricity supply industry.

References

1910 births
1997 deaths
English electrical engineers
Alumni of the University of Birmingham
Commanders of the Order of the British Empire
Knights Bachelor
Date of death missing